The 1950 Duquesne Dukes football team was an American football team that represented Duquesne University as an independent during the 1950 college football season. In its first and only season under head coach Doc Skender, Duquesne compiled a 2–6–1 record and was outscored by a total of 265 to 169. 

In January 1951, Duquesne president, the Rev. Vernon F. Gallagher, announced that the school had decided to suspend its participation in intercollegiate football. As reasons for the suspension, the school cited the manpower shortage resulting from the Korean War and noted that the school had suffered "heavy financial losses" from football over the last four years. The school did not resume competition in the sport until 1969.

Schedule

References

Duquesne
Duquesne Dukes football seasons
Duquesne Dukes football